The 1963 Soviet Cup was an association football cup competition of the Soviet Union.

Competition schedule

Preliminary stage

Group 1 (Russian Federation)

First round
 DINAMO Bryansk                1-0  Trud Noginsk 
 Metallurg Cherepovets         1-2  SPARTAK Leningrad 
 Shakhtyor Tula                0-1  VOLGA Kalinin 
 SPARTAK Oryol                 1-0  Onezhets Petrozavodsk 
 Spartak Ryazan                0-0  Zvezda Serpukhov 
 Sputnik Kaluga                1-2  VYMPEL Kaliningrad (M.R.) 
 TRAKTOR Vladimir              2-0  Tralflotovets Murmansk 
 TRUDOVIYE REZERVY Kursk       1-0  Serp i Molot Moskva

First round replays
 Spartak Ryazan                0-0  Zvezda Serpukhov 
 Spartak Ryazan                0-1  ZVEZDA Serpukhov

Quarterfinals
 Dinamo Bryansk                0-0  Volga Kalinin 
 SPARTAK Leningrad             2-1  Spartak Oryol 
 TRUDOVIYE REZERVY Kursk       1-0  Traktor Vladimir 
 Vympel Kaliningrad (M.R.)     1-2  ZVEZDA Serpukhov

Quarterfinals replays
 Dinamo Bryansk                1-2  VOLGA Kalinin

Semifinals
 VOLGA Kalinin                 2-0  Spartak Leningrad 
 ZVEZDA Serpukhov              8-1  Trudoviye Rezervy Kursk

Final
 VOLGA Kalinin                 2-1  Zvezda Serpukhov           [aet]

Group 2 (Russian Federation)

Preliminary round
 Torpedo Lipetsk               1-2  SKA Leningrad              [aet]

First round
 AVANGARD Kolomna              1-0  Volna Dzerzhinsk 
 Khimik Novomoskovsk           1-2  SPARTAK Smolensk 
 Neftyanik Syzran              1-1  Baltika Kaliningrad 
 SPARTAK Saransk               2-1  Energiya Voronezh 
 Spartak Tambov                1-3  SKA Leningrad 
 ZARYA Penza                   1-0  Volga Ulyanovsk 
 TEXTILSHCHIK Ivanovo          3-2  Torpedo Pavlovo 
 Znamya Truda Orekhovo-Zuyevo  2-2  Textilshchik Kostroma

First round replays
 NEFTYANIK Syzran              1-0  Baltika Kaliningrad 
 Znamya Truda Orekhovo-Zuyevo  1-2  TEXTILSHCHIK Kostroma

Quarterfinals
 Spartak Saransk               0-2  NEFTYANIK Syzran 
 Textilshchik Ivanovo          1-1  Spartak Smolensk  
 Textilshchik Kostroma         0-0  Avangard Kolomna 
 Zarya Penza                   1-3  SKA Leningrad

Quarterfinals replays
 TEXTILSHCHIK Ivanovo          1-0  Spartak Smolensk  
 TEXTILSHCHIK Kostroma         2-1  Avangard Kolomna           [aet]

Semifinals
 SKA Leningrad                 2-0  Neftyanik Syzran 
 TEXTILSHCHIK Ivanovo          3-1  Textilshchik Kostroma

Final
 Textilshchik Ivanovo          1-2  SKA Leningrad     [in Kalinin]

Group 3 (Russian Federation)

First round
 DINAMO Makhachkala            2-1  Spartak Nalchik 
 PROGRESS Kamensk              2-1  Cement Novorossiysk 
 SHAKHTYOR Shakhty             2-1  Dinamo Stavropol 
 SPARTAK Orjonikidze           3-1  Energiya Volzhskiy 
 TEREK Grozny                  2-1  Sokol Saratov               [aet] 
 Torpedo Armavir               1-2  TORPEDO Taganrog 
 Urozhai Maykop                1-3  ROSTSELMASH Rostov-na-Donu 
 Volgar Astrakhan              0-4  TRUDOVIYE REZERVY Kislovodsk

Quarterfinals
 DINAMO Makhachkala            2-0  Trudoviye Rezervy Kislovodsk 
 Progress Kamensk              0-1  SHAKHTYOR Shakhty 
 TEREK Grozny                  3-1  Spartak Orjonikidze 
 Torpedo Taganrog              1-1  RostSelMash Rostov-na-Donu

Quarterfinals replays
 Torpedo Taganrog              1-1  RostSelMash Rostov-na-Donu 
 TORPEDO Taganrog              2-0  RostSelMash Rostov-na-Donu

Semifinals
 SHAKHTYOR Shakhty             3-2  Torpedo Taganrog 
 Terek Grozny                  1-2  DINAMO Makhachkala          [aet]

Final
 SHAKHTYOR Shakhty             2-1  Dinamo Makhachkala

Group 4 (Russian Federation)

First round
 GEOLOG Tyumen                 1-0  Zvezda Perm 
 ISKRA Kazan                   1-0  Uralets Nizhniy Tagil 
 KHIMIK Salavat                2-1  Zenit Izhevsk 
 LOKOMOTIV Orenburg            2-1  Metallurg Kuibyshev 
 METALLURG Magnitogorsk        3-0  Salyut Kamensk-Uralskiy 
 Spartak Yoshkar-Ola           1-1  Progress Zelyonodolsk 
 STROITEL Kurgan               2-1  Khimik Berezniki 
 Stroitel Ufa                  0-1  DINAMO Kirov

First round replays
 Spartak Yoshkar-Ola           0-1  PROGRESS Zelyonodolsk       [aet]

Quarterfinals
 DINAMO Kirov                  3-1  Lokomotiv Orenburg 
 GEOLOG Tyumen                 1-0  Stroitel Kurgan 
 ISKRA Kazan                   3-1  Progress Zelyonodolsk 
 METALLURG Magnitogorsk        3-1  Khimik Salavat

Semifinals
 DINAMO Kirov                  2-1  Metallurg Magnitogorsk 
 ISKRA Kazan                   5-0  Geolog Tyumen

Final
 ISKRA Kazan                   4-2  Dinamo Kirov                [aet]

Group 5 (Russian Federation)

First round
 Avangard Komsomolsk-na-Amure  0-1  SKA Khabarovsk              [aet] 
 IRTYSH Omsk                   5-0  Tomich Tomsk                [aet] 
 KHIMIK Kemerovo               2-1  Shakhtyor Prokopyevsk 
 Luch Vladivostok              1-1  Amur Blagoveshchensk 
 SibSelMash Novosibirsk        2-6  TEMP Barnaul 
 Start Angarsk                 1-1  Angara Irkutsk 
 ZABAIKALETS Chita             2-1  Baykal Ulan-Ude

First round replays
 Luch Vladivostok              0-1  AMUR Blagoveshchensk 
 START Angarsk                 3-1  Angara Irkutsk

Quarterfinals
 LOKOMOTIV Krasnoyarsk         1-0  Khimik Kemerovo             [aet] 
 SKA Khabarovsk                1-0  Amur Blagoveshchensk 
 TEMP Barnaul                  1-0  Irtysh Omsk 
 Zabaikalets Chita             0-2  START Angarsk

Semifinals
 Start Angarsk                 1-2  SKA Khabarovsk              [aet] 
 TEMP Barnaul                  1-0  Lokomotiv Krasnoyarsk       [aet]

Final
 SKA Khabarovsk                2-0  Temp Barnaul

Group 1 (Ukraine)

First round
 DESNA Chernigov               1-0  Volyn Lutsk 
 DINAMO Khmelnitskiy           3-2  SKA Lvov 
 POLESYE Zhitomir              3-0  Kolhospnik Rovno 
 SKA Kiev                      2-1  Avangard Ternopol 
 SPARTAK Ivano-Frankovsk       1-0  Lokomotiv Vinnitsa

Quarterfinals
 Avangard Chernovtsy           0-2  SKA Kiev 
 POLESYE Zhitomir              1-0  Desna Chernigov 
 SPARTAK Ivano-Frankovsk       2-0  Dinamo Khmelnitskiy 
 VERKHOVINA Uzhgorod           2-1  Neftyanik Drogobych

Semifinals
 Polesye Zhitomir              2-3  SKA Kiev                    [aet] 
 Verkhovina Uzhgorod           1-2  SPARTAK Ivano-Frankovsk

Final
 SPARTAK Ivano-Frankovsk       2-1  SKA Kiev

Group 2 (Ukraine)

First round
 AzovStal Zhdanov              1-2  SHAKHTYOR Kadiyevka 
 BUREVESTNIK Melitopol         1-0  Spartak Sumy 
 LOKOMOTIV Donetsk             2-0  Metallurg Kerch 
 Shakhtyor Gorlovka            0-2  TORPEDO Kharkov 
 SKF Sevastopol                2-1  Metallurg Kommunarsk 
 TAVRIA Simferopol             3-0  Avangard Kramatorsk

Quarterfinals
 KHIMIK Severodonetsk          2-0  Burevestnik Melitopol 
 Metallurg Yenakiyevo          1-2  SKF Sevastopol 
 SHAKHTYOR Kadiyevka           1-0  Torpedo Kharkov             [aet] 
 TAVRIA Simferopol             1-0  Lokomotiv Donetsk

Semifinals
 Shakhtyor Kadiyevka           0-1  KHIMIK Severodonetsk        [aet] 
 SKF Sevastopol                2-0  Tavria Simferopol

Final
 SKF Sevastopol                1-2  KHIMIK Severodonetsk

Group 3 (Ukraine)

First round
 AVANGARD Zholtyye Vody        2-0  Dneprovets Dneprodzerzhinsk 
 KOLHOSPNIK Cherkassy          1-0  Zvezda Kirovograd           [aet] 
 SHAKHTYOR Alexandria          2-1  Dnepr Kremenchug 
 STROITEL Kherson              2-0  Kolhospnik Poltava 
 SUDOSTROITEL Nikolayev        2-1  Arsenal Kiev

Quarterfinals
 KOLHOSPNIK Cherkassy          2-1  Shakhtyor Alexandria        [aet] 
 SKA Odessa                    4-0  Gornyak Krivoi Rog 
 Stroitel Kherson              0-0  Avangard Zholtyye Vody 
 Trubnik Nikopol               0-2  SUDOSTROITEL Nikolayev

Quarterfinals replays
 Stroitel Kherson              1-2  AVANGARD Zholtyye Vody

Semifinals
 Avangard Zholtyye Vody        0-1  SKA Odessa 
 SUDOSTROITEL Nikolayev        2-0  Kolhospnik Cherkassy

Final
 Sudostroitel Nikolayev        0-1  SKA Odessa

Group 1 (Union republics)

First round
 DINAMO Batumi                 1-0  Stroitel Beltsy 
 DINAMO Kirovabad              1-0  Zvejnieks Liepaja           [aet] 
 KHIMIK Mogilyov               1-0  Dvina Vitebsk 
 Metallurg Rustavi             2-3  LUCHAFERUL Tiraspol         [aet] 
 NAIRI Yerevan                 2-0  Dinamo Sukhumi 
 NISTRUL Bendery               1-0  Lori Kirovakan              [aet] 
 SKA Minsk                     0-1  DINAMO Tallinn 
 Spartak Brest                 0-2  GRANITAS Klaipeda

Quarterfinals
 DINAMO Tallinn                2-0  Nistrul Bendery 
 GRANITAS Klaipeda             3-2  Khimik Mogilyov 
 LUCHAFERUL Tiraspol           2-0  Dinamo Kirovabad 
 NAIRI Yerevan                 1-0  Dinamo Batumi

Semifinals
 DINAMO Tallinn                5-0  Granitas Klaipeda 
 NAIRI Yerevan                 5-1  Luchaferul Tiraspol

Final
 DINAMO Tallinn                3-2  Nairi Yerevan

Group 2 (Union republics)

First round
 Neftyanik Fergana             0-1  KHIMIK Chirchik 
 PAMIR Leninabad               1-0  Metallist Jambul 
 Shirak Leninakan              2-2  Lokomotiv Tbilisi 
 Vostok Ust-Kamenogorsk        0-1  KOLKHIDA Poti

First round replays
 SHIRAK Leninakan              2-0  Lokomotiv Tbilisi

Quarterfinals
 ADK Alma-Ata                  0-2  SPARTAK Samarkand 
 ENERGETIK Dushanbe            3-2  Metallurg Chimkent 
 KHIMIK Chirchik               1-0  Pamir Leninabad             [aet]
 KOLKHIDA Poti                 1-0  Shirak Leninakan

Semifinals
 Kolkhida Poti                 1-2  ENERGETIK Dushanbe 
 SPARTAK Samarkand             1-0  Khimik Chirchik

Final
 SPARTAK Samarkand             3-2  Energetik Dushanbe

Final stage

Preliminary round
 [May 25] 
 KHIMIK Severodonetsk          2-0  Kuban Krasnodar 
 SHAKHTYOR Shakhty             4-1  Alga Frunze 
 SKA Leningrad                 2-1  Chernomorets Odessa 
   [R.Lapshin, V.Kondrashkin – A.Dvoyenkov pen] 
 Spartak Samarkand             2-3  SHAKHTYOR Karaganda 
   [? – Ignatyev 21, 36, Yulgushov 32]

First round
 [May 29] 
 SKA Odessa                    1-0  Karpaty Lvov 
   [O.Shchupakov 54] 
 [Jun 8] 
 DINAMO Tallinn                w/o  UralMash Sverdlovsk 
 Iskra Kazan                   1-2  METALLURG Zaporozhye        [aet] 
   [? – Kovalenko, Shchegolikhin] 
 SKA Leningrad                 0-0  Khimik Severodonetsk 
 Spartak Ivano-Frankovsk       0-2  DAUGAVA Riga 
 [Jun 11] 
 SHAKHTYOR Karaganda           2-0  Shakhtyor Shakhty           [aet] 
   [Korolkov-2 (1 pen)] 
 [Jun 12] 
 Dnepr Dnepropetrovsk          2-2  Žalgiris Vilnius 
   [Gurkin 20, Sukovitsyn 110 pen – R.Konofatskiy (D) 88 og, ?] 
 Lokomotiv Gomel               3-3  Lokomotiv Chelyabinsk 
   [V.Pivovarov (LC) 15 og, G.Tsiburevkin 17, L.Yerokhovets 90 – G.Yepishin 21, G.Korotayev 66, Smirnov 84] 
 Shinnik Yaroslavl             0-0  Volga Gorkiy 
 SKA Khabarovsk                2-0  Traktor Volgograd 
 SKA Novosibirsk               1-0  Trudoviye Rezervy Lugansk 
   [L.Karpov 8] 
 Volga Kalinin                 1-1  Trud Voronezh

First round replays
 [Jun 9] 
 SKA Leningrad                 2-1  Khimik Severodonetsk        [aet] 
 [Jun 13] 
 Dnepr Dnepropetrovsk          1-2  ŽALGIRIS Vilnius            [aet] 
   [Nesterov - ?] 
 Lokomotiv Gomel               0-0  Lokomotiv Chelyabinsk 
 SHINNIK Yaroslavl             3-1  Volga Gorkiy 
   [Anatoliy Isayev-2, Genrikh Fedosov - ?] 
 VOLGA Kalinin                 2-1  Trud Voronezh 
 [Jun 15] 
 LOKOMOTIV Gomel               3-1  Lokomotiv Chelyabinsk 
   [M.Khovrin-2, V.Korotkevich – G.Yepishin]

Second round
 [May 23] 
 TORPEDO Moskva                2-0  Ararat Yerevan 
   [Nemecio Pozuelo 25, Alexandr Medakin 85] 
 [Jun 15] 
 CSKA Moskva                   0-1  SHAKHTYOR Donetsk 
   [Valentin Sapronov 57] 
 [Jun 16] 
 DAUGAVA Riga                  3-0  Avangard Kharkov 
 DINAMO Leningrad              5-1  Pahtakor Tashkent 
 Dinamo Tallinn                0-0  Krylya Sovetov Kuibyshev 
 METALLURG Zaporozhye          1-0  SKA Rostov-na-Donu 
   [Kovalenko 82] 
 SHAKHTYOR Karaganda           3-0  Zenit Leningrad 
   [E.Avakov 8, V.Chuvakov 15, V.Korolkov 60] 
 Shinnik Yaroslavl             0-3  SPARTAK Moskva 
   [Yuriy Falin 31, Galimzyan Husainov 33, Yuriy Sevidov 41] 
 SKA Khabarovsk                1-1  Torpedo Kutaisi 
   [V.Sadovnikov - ?] 
 SKA Leningrad                 0-1  KAYRAT Alma-Ata 
 SKA Novosibirsk               3-1  Neftyanik Baku              [aet] 
 SKA Odessa                    0-1  DINAMO Moskva 
   [Yuriy Vshivtsev 69 pen] 
 VOLGA Kalinin                 4-2  Dinamo Tbilisi              [aet] 
   [V.Orekhov-2, I.Abramov-2 – Zaur Kaloyev-2] 
 Žalgiris Vilnius              2-4  MOLDOVA Kishinev 
 [Jun 17] 
 DINAMO Kiev                   2-0  Lokomotiv Moskva 
   [Viktor Serebryanikov 48, Oleg Bazilevich 87] 
 DINAMO Minsk                  3-0  Lokomotiv Gomel 
   [Mikhail Mustygin-2, Eduard Malofeyev]

Second round replays
 [Jun 17] 
 DINAMO Tallinn                3-1  Krylya Sovetov Kuibyshev 
 SKA Khabarovsk                1-0  Torpedo Kutaisi             [aet] 
   [B.Semyonov pen]

Third round
 [Jun 28] 
 Daugava Riga                  0-1  DINAMO Minsk 
   [Leonard Adamov 6] 
 DINAMO Leningrad              2-1  Volga Kalinin 
   [Anatoliy Boitsov, Viktor Nikolayev – V.Orekhov] 
 KAYRAT Alma-Ata               3-1  Metallurg Zaporozhye 
   [Oleg Maltsev 31, 33, Vadim Stepanov 66 – B.Sokolov 44] 
 MOLDOVA Kishinev              2-0  Dinamo Tallinn 
 SHAKHTYOR Donetsk             4-1  Torpedo Moskva 
   [Anatoliy Rodin 27, 57, 62, Yuriy Ananchenko ? – Alexandr Abayev 80] 
 SKA Khabarovsk                1-0  SKA Novosibirsk 
   [B.Semyonov 20 pen] 
 SPARTAK Moskva                1-0  Dinamo Kiev 
   [Galimzyan Husainov 8] 
 [Jun 29] 
 DINAMO Moskva                 2-1  Shakhtyor Karaganda 
   [Yuriy Vshivtsev 33, Nikolai Bobkov 38 – V.Korolkov 49]

Quarterfinals
 [Jul 17] 
 SHAKHTYOR Donetsk             2-1  SKA Khabarovsk 
   [Mikhail Ivanov 73, Mikhail Zakharov 87 – V.Sadovnikov 13] 
 [Jul 26] 
 Moldova Kishinev              1-1  Kayrat Alma-Ata 
   [Valeriy Kolbasyuk ? – Sergei Kvochkin 22] 
 [Aug 3] 
 Dinamo Minsk                  0-2  DINAMO Moskva               [aet] 
   [Arkadiy Nikolayev 101, Yuriy Vshivtsev 119] 
 SPARTAK Moskva                4-1  Dinamo Leningrad 
   [Yuriy Falin 32, Gennadiy Logofet ?, Yuriy Sevidov ? pen, Vyacheslav Ambartsumyan 80 – Yuriy Varlamov 6]

Quarterfinals replays
 [Jul 27] 
 Moldova Kishinev              0-1  KAYRAT Alma-Ata 
   [Vadim Stepanov 17]

Semifinals
 [Aug 6] 
 SHAKHTYOR Donetsk             2-1  Kayrat Alma-Ata             [aet]  [in Yaroslavl] 
   [Yuriy Ananchenko 16, Anatoliy Rodin 96 – Yevgeniy Kuznetsov 55] 
 SPARTAK Moskva                2-0  Dinamo Moskva 
   [Vyacheslav Ambartsumyan 19, Gennadiy Logofet 57 pen]

Final

External links
 Complete calendar. helmsoccer.narod.ru
 1963 Soviet Cup. Footballfacts.ru
 1963 Soviet football season. RSSSF

Soviet Cup seasons
Cup
Soviet Cup
Soviet Cup